Cooksville Creek is a short stream in Mississauga, Regional Municipality of Peel in the Greater Toronto Area of Ontario, Canada. It begins near Bristol Road West and Hurontario Street and flows south to Lake Ontario at R.K McMilian Park near Lakeshore Road and Cawthra Road. The community of Cooksville is located on the west bank of the creek near Hurontario Street and Dundas Street East. The creek is surrounded mostly by residential homes and a few parks:

 R.K. McMilian Park
 Camilla Park
 Cooksville Park
 R. Jones Park
 Mississauga Valley Park
 Stonebrook Park
 Woodington Green
 Kingsbridge Common

References

Tributaries of Lake Ontario
Rivers of Mississauga